Mouhamadou Diaw (born 2 February 1981) is a Senegalese professional football midfielder who plays for Réunion club AS Excelsior.

Career
Diaw signed with Niort from La Vitréenne on 10 July 2009. He joined Auxerre in the summer of 2015.

References

External links

Living people
1981 births
People from Kaolack
Association football forwards
Senegalese footballers
Serer sportspeople
Senegal international footballers
Ligue 2 players
Championnat National players
Championnat National 2 players
ASC Jeanne d'Arc players
SC Draguignan players
Amiens SC players
Clermont Foot players
La Vitréenne FC players
Chamois Niortais F.C. players
AJ Auxerre players
ÉFC Fréjus Saint-Raphaël players
AS Excelsior players
Senegalese expatriate footballers
Senegalese expatriate sportspeople in France
Expatriate footballers in France